Lauren Marie Sesselmann (born August 14, 1983) is an American-born Canadian soccer player and Olympic bronze medalist who is currently playing as a defender or a forward for the Santa Clarita Blue Heat. She was also a member of the Canada national team from 2011 to 2015, and is also a trainer, producer and host of the fitness DVD program Fit As A Pro with Lauren Sesselmann.

Early life
Sesselmann was raised in Green Bay, Wisconsin.  She starred in both soccer and basketball at Notre Dame Academy in Green Bay, winning multiple letters and helping Notre Dame to an undefeated season and a Wisconsin state championship in girls' basketball in 2001.

Purdue University
Sesselmann played collegiately at Purdue University from 2001 through 2005.  She set six records for the Boilermakers in points, goals, assists, game-winning goals, multiple-goal games, and shots on goal registered.  She was also named First Team All-Big Ten in 2003 and 2005.

Club career

Following her time at Purdue, Sesselmann remained in the area to play for F.C. Indiana, based in Greater Lafayette.  She played in both the Women's Premier Soccer League in 2007 and W-League in 2008 with the club.  She scored nine goals and four assists in 14 games for the Lionesses in 2008, as they were runners-up in the W-League.

On January 16, 2009, Sesselmann was drafted by Chicago Red Stars with the 44th overall pick in the 2009 WPS Draft.  She was waived prior to the season and signed by Sky Blue FC in May 2009. In 2010, Sesselmann attended training camp with Saint Louis Athletica, but was released during camp.  She then signed with the Atlanta Beat, where manager Gareth O'Sullivan converted her from forward to defence. Sesselmann debuted with the Atlanta Beat on April 11, 2010 in a match against Philadelphia Independence, earning her first WPS start at left back.

In 2013, she joined FC Kansas City in the new National Women's Soccer League. On January 10, 2014, it was announced that Sesselmann was selected by the Houston Dash with the third pick in the 2014 NWSL Expansion Draft. However, her role with the Dash has been put into question by a statement from her agent stating it is "in her best interest to explore options as a free agent".

Following two years out of the game, Sesselmann joined the Santa Clarita Blue Heat in May 2017.

International career

Sesselmann acquired Canadian citizenship in 2010 through her father, who is from Newfoundland and Labrador, and was called up to the Canada national team for training camp leading up to two friendlies against the United States in September 2011. She won her first cap on September 17, 2011 against the USA, playing the full 90 minutes. She also started her second game on September 23, 2011.

Sesselmann was named to the 18-player Canadian squad for the 2011 Pan American Games at Guadalajara. She started in four of five matches and appeared as a substitute in the other as Canada went on to win the gold medal.

In Canada's run to a bronze medal at the 2012 Olympics, Sesselmann started all six matches.

Sesslemann represented Canada at the 2015 FIFA Women's World Cup. In the quarter-finals against England, she slipped and fell on the turf, which led to a goal for England.

Sesslemann was honoured by Canada Soccer in June 2017, along with fellow Olympic bronze medalists Jonelle Filigno, Robyn Gayle, Kaylyn Kyle and Josée Bélanger.

References

External links

 
 Lauren Sesselmann profile at Houston Dash
 
 Purdue player profile
 FC Kansas City player profile
 

1983 births
Living people
Citizens of Canada through descent
Canadian women's soccer players
American women's soccer players
Canadian people of German descent
American emigrants to Canada
Sportspeople from Green Bay, Wisconsin
Women's association football midfielders
Atlanta Beat (WPS) players
Footballers at the 2011 Pan American Games
Footballers at the 2012 Summer Olympics
National Women's Soccer League players
Purdue Boilermakers women's soccer players
Olympic soccer players of Canada
Olympic medalists in football
Olympic bronze medalists for Canada
NJ/NY Gotham FC players
FC Kansas City players
Canada women's international soccer players
Medalists at the 2012 Summer Olympics
Houston Dash players
2015 FIFA Women's World Cup players
Women's association football forwards
Women's association football defenders
Soccer players from Wisconsin
Pan American Games gold medalists for Canada
Pan American Games medalists in football
F.C. Indiana players
Medalists at the 2011 Pan American Games
Women's Professional Soccer players